Żygulski is a Polish surname. Notable people with the surname include:

Kazimierz Żygulski (1919–2012), Polish sociologist, political activist and Minister of Culture
Zdzisław Żygulski, Jr. (born 1921), Polish art historian, son of Zdzisław Żygulski, Sr.
Zdzisław Żygulski, Sr. (1888–1975), Polish literary historian and Germanist

Polish-language surnames